Walter Aston, 4th Lord Aston of Forfar (1660 or 1661 – 4 April 1748) was the eldest surviving son of Walter Aston, 3rd Lord Aston of Forfar, and his first wife Eleanor Blount of Soddington, daughter of Sir Walter Blount, 1st Baronet.

Biography
In 1714, he succeeded his father as Lord Aston of Forfar in the peerage of Scotland. Despite the title, they were a Staffordshire family whose seat was at Tixall.

He married Lady Mary Howard, daughter of Lord Thomas Howard and Mary Savile, and sister of Thomas Howard, 8th Duke of Norfolk and Edward Howard, 9th Duke of Norfolk, by whom he had five sons and six daughters, most of whom died in infancy. She died in 1723 during the birth of their 11th child, James, who would succeed him as Lord Aston of Forfar. Two daughters also reached adult life: Margaret, who became a nun, and Catherine, who married Edward Weld of Lulworth Castle, Dorset. The Astons, like the Howards, were staunch Roman Catholics: during the outbreak of anti-Catholic hysteria called the Popish Plot, Walter's father and uncle had been charged with treason and imprisoned in the Tower of London, although they were never brought to trial, and in due course were simply released.

The 4th Lord Aston commissioned a painting of himself, his wife, and seven of their children by Richard van Bleeck. The painting, which survives, was not completed until two years after Lady Aston's death.

He died on 4 April 1748, and was succeeded by his fifth but only surviving son James Aston, 5th Lord Aston of Forfar.

References 
Paul, James Balfour. (1904.) "The Scots Peerage: Founded on Wood's Edition of Sir Robert Douglas's Peerage, Volume I". David Douglas: Edinburgh, pp. 411–413. Retrieved 2007-10-11.

Kenyon, J.P.  The Popish Plot (2000) Phoenix  Press reissue 

Lords of Parliament
1660 births
1748 deaths